Epcot is a theme park located at the Walt Disney World Resort. The term "attractions" is used by Disney as a catch-all term for rides, shows, and exhibits.

World Celebration

World Celebration attractions
 Spaceship Earth is an eighteen-story-tall geodesic sphere, located at the front entrance of Epcot. The ride tells the history of communication, with a focus on the development of cultures and the future of technologies.
 Project Tomorrow: Inventing the Wonders of the Future is an interactive post show following Spaceship Earth showcasing many "virtual reality" games.
 Imagination! is a pavilion that contains attractions that highlight imagination.
 Journey into Imagination with Figment is a ride that encourages guests to use their senses and their imagination.
 ImageWorks: The What-If Labs is an interactive post show following Journey into Imagination.
 Disney & Pixar Short Film Festival is a 3-D show composed of three animated shorts.

Past World Celebration attractions 
 Odyssey Events Pavilion is a flexspace building at Epcot as near the borders of World Celebration and World Showcase.
 The EPCOT Experience Center is a new home of the Odyssey Events Pavilion to discover a series of engaging exhibits that showcase the relentless innovation, energy and excitement driving the Park's unprecedented evolution.

World Celebration entertainment 
 JAMMitors, trashcan percussion band that plays daily.

World Discovery

World Discovery attractions
 Mission: Space is a centrifuge-based ride that simulates the training required to be a member of the space program.
 Test Track (Presented by Chevrolet) is a high-speed ride that allows guest to design their own concept vehicles then test them on the "Sim Track" as they ride along in a "Sim-Car."
Wonders of Xandar is a Pavilion attraction that Xandarian Ship Foundation as being EPCOT's very first other-world Showcase Pavilion. 
 Guardians of the Galaxy: Cosmic Rewind is a roller coaster inspired by Marvel's Guardians of the Galaxy films.
Guardians of the Galaxy: Cosmic Rewind: Holiday Remix (seasonal)

World Nature

World Nature attractions
 The Land is a pavilion that contains attractions that detail how we interact with our natural environment.
Harvest Theater 
Awesome Planet is a 4D film about the Earth's biomes and the perils of climate change, with narration by Ty Burrell.
 Living with the Land (Presented by Chiquita Brands International) takes visitors on a boat tour through a working greenhouse.
Living with the Land: Merry and Bright Nights (seasonal; 2019-2021)
Living with the Land: Glimmering Greenhouses (seasonal; 2022-)
 Soarin' Around the World is a hang glider simulator that "flies" over various locations across the world.
 The Seas is one of the largest aquariums in the world.
 The Seas with Nemo & Friends is a ride chronicling Nemo's epic journey, featuring projection technology that makes it appear as though Nemo, Dory, and Marlin are swimming with the live fish.
 Turtle Talk with Crush is an interactive show starring Crush, the Sea Turtle, from Disney/Pixar's Finding Nemo and Finding Dory.

Future

Upcoming attractions
 World Celebration
 Dreamers Point is a location of World Celebration, accessed from Spaceship Earth, which discover live entertainment, festival experiences, lush gardens and a statue of Walt Disney as Walt the Dreamers
 World Discovery
 PLAY! is a play themed pavilion to occupy the vacant Wonders of Life building.
 World Nature
Journey of Water is a walk-through attraction inspired by Disney's animated feature film, Moana.

Retired features

Past Future World attractions

Other past attractions

Past Future World entertainment
 Fountain of Nations (Original: 1982-1992/Refurbished: 1993–2019), an elaborate fountain that performed to music every 15 minutes. Shows were presented in no particular order and included music by John Tesh, Yanni, and from Disney movies such as The Rescuers Down Under and The Rocketeer.
 Splashtacular- A show that debuted in 1994 and included the Fountain of Nations and ended a few months later. The attraction was closed due to the water from the fountain blowing onto the stage, soaking the performers and the guests. It also would cause the walkways to get very crowded, making it hard for people to get through.
 EPCOT Computer Central, an area in CommuniCore that featured two shows:
 The Astuter Computer Revue (1982–1984), presented by Sperry Corporation.
 Backstage Magic (1984–1994), a show about how computers controlled park operations around Walt Disney World. Presented by Unisys.
 Disney Vision Adventure: In Virtual Reality, a show that took place in Innoventions about how Disney movies are made using CGI technology featuring Iago from Aladdin.
 Future Corps was a drum and bugle corps band which entertained guests with a high energy instrumental show. The group performed at Epcot from 1982 to 2006.
 Future World Brass, a high energy brass and percussion ensemble that performed at Epcot from 1982 to 2000.
 Wheel of Fortune Live, Tapings of Wheel of Fortune were held near the World Showcase entrance.

World Showcase

Current World Showcase attractions
 DuckTales World Showcase Adventure

 Mexico
 Gran Fiesta Tour Starring the Three Caballeros is a boat ride adventure with José Carioca, Panchito Pistoles, and Donald Duck.

 Norway
 Frozen Ever After is a boat ride based on Disney's Frozen.

 China
 Circle-Vision 360
 Reflections of China, is a Circle-Vision 360° movie exploring China's history and scenery.
 The Outpost is a small Africa-themed area that acts as an unofficial World Showcase Pavilion and includes shopping and refreshments.

 Germany
 Germany Model Train Display is a small model train layout that features a display of a city and tunnels around the layout's two loops. This is the only attraction in the pavilion until the opening of The American Adventure's Christmas Tree Layout.

 Italy

 The American Adventure
 The American Adventure is a stage show about American history using Audio-Animatronics.
 Model Train Display  (Christmas season only): A model train layout that circles around a tall Christmas tree

 Japan

 Morocco

 France
 Palais du Cinéma
 Impressions de France is a panoramic movie which visits many of France's cities and historical structures.
 Beauty and the Beast Sing-Along is a film based on Disney's Beauty and the Beast reliving the songs from the classic movie. 
 Remy's Ratatouille Adventure is a ride based on Disney/Pixar's Ratatouille.

 United Kingdom

 Canada
Circle-Vision 360
 Canada: Far and Wide

Upcoming World Showcase attractions
 China
Circle-Vision 360
 Wondrous China 
 United Kingdom
 Mary Poppins attraction and Cherry Tree Lane expansion (shelved)

Current World Showcase entertainment

Fireworks Shows
 HarmonioUS (October 1, 2021 – April 2, 2023)
 Epcot Forever (October 1, 2019 – March 13, 2020; July 1, 2021 - September 28, 2021; Returns on April 3, 2023)

Upcoming World Showcase entertainment

Fireworks Shows
 TBA

Past World Showcase attractions
 Mexico
 El Rio del Tiempo (The River of Time) (1982 – 2007), was a boat ride that shows many aspects of Mexican life, history, and celebrations.
 Norway
 Maelstrom (1988 – 2014), was a boat ride into Norway's past and present.
 Canada
Circle-Vision 360
 Portraits of Canada, this film from Expo 86 in Canada was played temporarily instead of "O Canada"
 Canada 67
 O Canada! (1982 – 2007), the Circle-Vision 360° film was updated in 2007.
 O Canada! (2007 - 2019), was a Circle-Vision 360° that was succeeded by Canada: Far and Wide.
 China
Circle-Vision 360
 Wonders of China (1982 – 2003), the Circle-Vision 360° film was updated in 2003.
 Millennium Village (1999 – 2000), a large building built for the Millennium Celebration with many small attractions that represent countries not in World Showcase.
 Kim Possible World Showcase Adventure (2009 – 2012)
 Agent P World Showcase Adventure (2012 – 2020)

Past World Showcase entertainment

Fireworks Shows
 Carnival de Lumiere (premiered October 23, 1982)
 A New World Fantasy (premiered June 1983)
 Laserphonic Fantasy (June 9, 1984 - January 24, 1988)
 IllumiNations (January 30, 1988 - September 20, 1996)
 IllumiNations 25 (A) (September 21, 1996 - May 18, 1997)
 IllumiNations 25 (B) (May 19, 1997 - January 31, 1998)
 IllumiNations (98) (February 1, 1998 - September 21, 1999)
 Surprise in the Skies (1991–1992)
 Skyleidoscope (1985–1987) Planes were launched from the Epcot Center Ultralight Flightpark.
 IllumiNations: Reflections of Earth (October 1, 1999 – September 30, 2019), previously "IllumiNations 2000: Reflections of Earth", created for the Millennium Celebration, ended on September 30, 2019, to make way for a new fireworks show called Epcot Forever.

Parades
 Tapestry of Nations (1999–2001), a parade created for the Millennium Celebration
 Tapestry of Dreams (2001–2003), a refurbished version of Tapestry of Nations replacing the Sage of Time, the parade's original host/narrator with three Dreamseekers

Live and Musical Entertainment
Acts with * are no longer performing

 Mexico
 Mariachi Cobre, mariachi band
 Norway
 Spelmanns Gledje*, Norwegian folk music
 China
 Si Xian*, traditional Chinese music played on authentic instruments 
 Dragon Legend Acrobats*, group of young Chinese acrobats 
 Jeweled Dragon Acrobats, group of young Chinese acrobats
 Germany
 Oktoberfest Musikanten, dinner theater
 Italy
 Sergio, juggler
 Lou E. G.*, mime, comedian, magician, street performer
 Rondo Veneziano*, Electronic Classical Music Group
 Nova Era*, Electronic Classical Music group (now at Downtown Disney)
 Imaginum A statue Act* Living statue act
 The American Adventure
 Voices of Liberty, a cappella choir singing traditional American songs
 Spirit of America Fife & Drum Corps
 American Vybe*, contemporary a cappella group performing American R&B, Jazz, and Swing
 Japan
 Matsuriza, Taiko drummers
 Miyuki*, candy artist
 Morocco
 MoRockin*, Arabic rhythms fused with rock n' roll
 Restaurant Marrakesh, Traditional Moroccan music and dance inside restaurant
 France
 Serveur Amusant, the comical waiter
 United Kingdom
 The British Invasion*, a '60s British rock-and-roll revival
 The British Revolution, a British rock band playing hits from the '60s to the early '90s
 The Hat Lady, pianist in the Rose 'n Crown Pub
 Jason Wethington, Magician, appearing at the Rose and Crown Pub
 Canada
 Off Kilter*, a Celtic and Canadian rock band

EPCOT celebrations
 Millennium Celebration (1999–2000), this included:
 A Mickey Mouse hand holding a wand over Spaceship Earth with the text "2000" (wand then changed to say "Epcot"; 1999–2007)
 Millennium Central: a rethemed area in front of the Fountain of Nations. Includes the Pin Station.
 IllumiNations 2000: Reflections of Earth, the new nightly fireworks show. Its name was changed to IllumiNations: Reflections of Earth after the Millennium Celebration.
 Tapestry of Nations (1999–2001): a new parade about unity and world peace featuring large puppets.
 Millennium Village (1999–2000): a large building with many small attractions that represent other countries that are not in World Showcase.
 100 Years of Magic (2001), part of the Walt Disney World Resort celebration.
 Tapestry of Dreams (2001–2002), a refurbished version of Tapestry of Nations replacing the Sage of Time, the parade's original host/narrator with three Dreamseekers.
 25th Anniversary (October 1, 2007): included a re-dedication of the park, presentations by Marty Sklar, an exhibit showing the history of EPCOT, fan gatherings, and was concluded by a special IllumiNations: Reflections of Earth which added an extra few minutes of fireworks. Classic Epcot songs ranging from We've Just Begun to Dream from opening day to Celebrate the Future Hand in Hand from the Millennium Celebration were played around the entrance and around the park all day.
 Wheel of Fortune at Walt Disney World (October 10, 2017 — February 16, 2018): A road show of Wheel took place between 2017 and 2018.
 The World's Most Magical Celebration (2021-2023), part of the Walt Disney World Resort's 50th Anniversary celebration.

See also
 List of Disney theme park attractions
 List of lands at Disney theme parks
 List of Magic Kingdom attractions
 List of Disney's Hollywood Studios attractions
 List of Disney's Animal Kingdom attractions

References

External links
 Walt Disney World Resort - Epcot
 Walt Disney World Resort - Epcot Attractions
 Walt Disney World Resort - Epcot Dining

Epcot